Gnanapazham is a 1996 Indian Tamil-language drama film,  directed R. P. Viswam and written by K. Bhagyaraj who also composed the music. The film stars Bhagyaraj, Sukanya, Vineetha and Rekha.

Cast
K. Bhagyaraj as Gnanasuryan 
Sukanya as Aarthi
R. P. Viswam as Rathnam 
Rekha as Nirmala
S. N. Lakshmi as Gnanasuryan's mother
 Prabhu Deva as Prabhu 
Kasthuri as Aarthi Navel Massager
Vineetha as Thakkali Jothi 
Goundamani as Aarthi's brother
Senthil as Aazhagu Aarthi's car driver
Mayilsamy as Bar Owner
Junior Balaiah as Sathyamoorthy's assistant 
Kovai Senthil as Kanthasamy (Building contractor)

Soundtrack 
Soundtrack was composed by K. Bhagyaraj. Pa. Vijay made his debut as lyricist with this film.
"Yaarum Illadha" - Sujatha, P. Unnikrishnan
"Marina Beach" - Malgudi Subha
"Hey Sayorana" - Mano, Suresh Peters, Swarnalatha
"Unnaipol" - Mano
"Manimaada" - SPB
"Onnum Onnum" - Harini, K. Bhagyaraj

References

1996 films
1990s Tamil-language films
Films with screenplays by K. Bhagyaraj
Journalism adapted into films
Films about journalists
Films scored by K. Bhagyaraj